Bambuco is a traditional music genre from Colombia. Its metric structure is similar to the European waltz or polska (not to be confused with the polka).

Bambuco took a cultural foothold in the Andean region of Colombia and has spread in popularity throughout Latin America. The Festival Folclórico y Reinado Nacional del Bambuco in Neiva is a festival celebrating bambuco music.

"Cuatro Preguntas" is one of the most famous songs in the genre, having been included by El Tiempo at No. 8 on its list of the 50 best Colombian songs of all time.

References

External links
 Retorno de Jose Dolores - Andina completa.mp3

 
Andean music
Native American dances
Colombian styles of music